Geomagnetic latitude, or magnetic latitude (MLAT), is a parameter analogous to geographic latitude, except that, instead of being defined relative to the geographic poles, it is defined by the axis of the geomagnetic dipole, which can be accurately extracted from the International Geomagnetic Reference Field (IGRF).

See also
 Earth's magnetic field
 Geomagnetic equator
 Ionosphere
 L-shell
 Magnetosphere
 World Magnetic Model (WMM)

References

External links
 Space Weather: Maps of Geomagnetic Latitude (Northwest Research Associates)
 Tips on Viewing the Aurora (SWPC)
 Magnetic Field Calculator (NCEI)
 Ionospheric Electrodynamics Using Magnetic Apex Coordinates (Journal of Geomagnetism and Geoelectricity)

Geomagnetism
Geographic coordinate systems